Below the belt is a term in combat sports.

Below the Belt may also refer to:

Music
 Below the Belt, a 1966 stage musical featuring Madeline Kahn
 Below the Belt, a music DVD by Hellyeah
 Below the Belt (Boxer album)
 Below the Belt (Danko Jones album)
 Below the Belt (Pigface album)
 Below the Belt, a 1986 album by TKO
 Below the Belt, an a 1980 film directed by Robert Fowler

Other
 Below the Belt (1999 film) from List of lesbian, gay, bisexual or transgender-related films#B